Damien Hugh Coyle (born 1978 
in Northern Ireland) is an Irish computer scientist and researcher, best known for his various publications on computational neuroscience, neuroimaging, neurotechnology, and brain-computer interface. He has served as Professor of Neurotechnology at the Ulster University. He was made a fellow of the Royal Academy of Engineering in 2013.

Works

References 

1957 births
Living people
British computer scientists